Phoebe Elisabeth Turner (born 8 August 2003) is an English cricketer who currently plays for Yorkshire and Northern Diamonds. She plays as a right-handed batter.

Domestic career
Turner first played for Yorkshire in 2020, in friendlies arranged when the county season was cancelled due to the COVID-19 pandemic. She made her full county debut for Yorkshire in the 2021 Women's Twenty20 Cup, against Cumbria. She played 7 matches for the side in the 2022 Women's Twenty20 Cup, scoring 95 runs with a top score of 26.

Turner was named in the Northern Diamonds Academy squad for the 2021 season. She was promoted to the first team squad ahead of the 2022 season. She made her debut for the side on 14 May 2022, against Lightning in the Charlotte Edwards Cup. She went on to play eight matches overall for Northern Diamonds in the 2022 season. At the end of the 2022 season, it was announced that Turner had signed her first professional contract with Northern Diamonds.

References

External links

2003 births
Living people
Place of birth missing (living people)
Yorkshire women cricketers
Northern Diamonds cricketers